Fairy Tales, released in the UK as Adult Fairy Tales, is a 1978 sex comedy directed by Harry Hurwitz, the plot of which revolves around the stereotypical fairy tale.

Synopsis

On his twenty-first birthday, a prince is approached by his father (the king) and other courtiers. They present him a girl as birthday gift. The king asks him to enjoy sexual life and to produce the next heir. However, the prince experiences erectile dysfunction and is unable to perform sexually. He discovers that his sexual attraction is focused towards a long forgotten princess whose picture is hanging on the wall. He goes in search of this princess, and encounters many people along the way. Ultimately, he finds the princess and is able to perform sexually with her.

Cast
 Don Sparks as Prince
 Sy Richardson as Sirus
 Irwin Corey as Dr. Eyes (as Prof. Irwin Corey)
 Robert Harris as Dr. Ears
 Simmy Bow as Dr. Mustachio
 Robert Staats as Doorman / Tommy Tucker
 Martha Reeves as Aunt La Voh
 Anne Gaybis as Snow White
 Brenda Fogarty as Gussie Gander
 Frank Ray Perilli as Baron
 Angelo Rossitto as Otto
 Bob Leslie as Old King Cole
 Jeff Doucette as Jack
 Lindsay Freeman as Jill
 Nai Bonet as Scheherazade
 Angela Aames as Little Bo Peep
 Linnea Quigley as Sleeping Beauty

External links
 

1978 films
1970s English-language films
American sex comedy films
1970s sex comedy films
Films directed by Harry Hurwitz
1978 comedy films
Erotic fantasy films
1970s American films